The chart below shows the difference between S. L. Wong (romanization), Guangdong Romanization, Cantonese Pinyin, Jyutping, Yale, Sidney Lau, Meyer–Wempe, along with IPA, S. L. Wong phonetic symbols and Cantonese Bopomofo.

Chart

Initials

Finals

Tones

Languages of Hong Kong
Cantonese romanisation
Romanization of Chinese
All articles needing additional references
Cantonese romanization systems